Presidential elections were due to be held in Cyprus in February 1978. However, after Vassos Lyssarides of the Movement for Social Democracy announced on 8 January that he would not stand as a candidate, acting President Spyros Kyprianou (who had held office since the death of Makarios III in August 1977) was left as the only remaining candidate. Kyprianou officially became President on 26 January.

References

1978 in Cyprus
Cyprus
Presidential elections in Cyprus
Single-candidate elections
Uncontested elections
February 1978 events in Europe